Nafaqah or nafkah is the Islamic legal term for the financial support a husband must provide for his wife during marriage and for a time after divorce. Under an Islamic marriage agreement, the husband is obliged to pay for his wife's housing, food and clothing in the course of their marriage. In the event of divorce, the same mode of support is stipulated for three months afterwards. Depending on social class and agreement, nafaqah can also include support for the wife's family members or servants, so as to provide a living standard consistent with her peers.

References

Sharia legal terminology
Marriage in Islam
Islamic terminology
Arabic words and phrases in Sharia